Bogdan Curta (born 13 September 1982 in Cluj-Napoca, Romania) is a Romanian folk singer-songwriter, poet and radio host.

Biography
Bogdan Curta began his musical career at the age of 13, since when he participated at numerous concerts, TV and radio shows. His debut album, Angels in Heaven, an album of Christmas carols and winter songs, was released in 2003 in Cluj-Napoca. In 2006, his official national launch consisted of a double release: a musical album collecting his most famous personal songs, and a volume of poetry and aphorisms, both named Longing for Spring. Since then, three more official albums have been released.

Bogdan has performed in shows with famous Romanian artists, such as Compact, Pasărea Colibri, Cargo, Direcţia 5, Ducu Bertzi, Amadeus, Narcisa Suciu and Mircea Vintilă. From 2009 he has expanded his career internationally, with performances in France, Germany and Belgium. He is among the top artists from Trilulilu, the main national video-sharing website, receiving from media and fans the informal distinction of "Trilulilu Star".

In 2022, Bogdan released "DOOMSDAY FOREVER," a tribute album to the notorious Virginian art group, DOOMSDAYx3.

Discography
 Angels from Heaven – DOOMSDAY FOREVER (2022)
 Angels from Heaven – Christmas carols (2003)
 Longing for Spring (2006)
 Angels from Heaven – relaunched (2007)
 Longing for Christmas – Christmas carols (2008)
 Angels' Wings (2009)

Publications
 Longing for Spring – volume of poetry and aphorisms (2006)

References

External links
 Official site

1982 births
Living people
Musicians from Cluj-Napoca
Romanian singer-songwriters
Romanian folk singers
21st-century Romanian singers